Cynical realism is a contemporary movement in Chinese art, especially in the form of painting, that began in the 1990s. Beginning in Beijing, it has become one of the most popular Chinese contemporary art movements in mainland China. It arose throughout  the pursuit of individual expression by Chinese artists who broke away from the collective mindset that existed since the Cultural Revolution. The major themes tend to focus on socio-political issues and events since Revolutionary China (1911) to the present. These include having a usually humorous and post-ironic take on a realist perspective and interpretation of the transition that Chinese society has been through, from the advent of Communism to today's industrialization and modernization.

Artists associated with Cynical Realism include Fang Lijun, Liu Wei, and Yue Minjun.

References

Art movements
Chinese art
Modern art
Realism (art movement)